Albert Myron "Chink" Zachary (born Albert Myron Zarski; May 14, 1914 – June 24, 2006) was an American professional baseball pitcher. He played in four games (two of them starts) in Major League Baseball for the Brooklyn Dodgers during the 1944 season. He played in parts of 10 minor league seasons between 1936 and 1951, including at the Triple-A level in 1948 and 1951.

Zachary was born in Brooklyn, New York, and died in Rome, New York. He was sometimes referred to by the nickname "Chink", and has been listed under that name by some baseball reference sites.

References

External links

1914 births
2006 deaths
Major League Baseball pitchers
Brooklyn Dodgers players
Dothan Boll Weevils players
Dothan Browns players
Mayfield Clothiers players
Utica Braves players
New Orleans Pelicans (baseball) players
Montreal Royals players
Fort Worth Cats players
Mobile Bears players
Oakland Oaks (baseball) players
Minor league baseball managers
Baseball players from New York (state)
Sportspeople from Brooklyn
Baseball players from New York City